Raphael Chikukwa (born 1970) is a Zimbabwean curator and the Executive Director of the National Gallery of Zimbabwe in 2020. Prior to this, he was Chief Curator and before that spent a decade as an independent curator. Chikukwa is a Chevening Scholar who holds an MA in Curating Contemporary Design from Kingston University London.

Career 
He was trained at Harare Art Centre in Mbare.  He volunteered at the second Johannesburg Biennale in 1997 working under Okwui Enwezor. He then spent the next decade working as an independent curator. Chikukwa studied and trained in Europe before he was appointed Curator of the National Gallery of Zimbabwe. While there he was the founding curator of the Zimbabwean Pavilion at the 54th Venice Biennale in 2011, and he organised the country's representation in 2013, 2015, 2017, 2019 and 2022. Chikukwa was appointed Executive Director of the National Gallery of Zimbabwe in 2020.

Publications 
Visions of Zimbabwe (Manchester City Art Galleries, 2004); 
Mawonero/Umbono: Insights on Art in Zimbabwe (Kerber Verlag, 2016); 
Kabbo Ka Muwala: Migration and Mobility in Contemporary Art (Revolver, 2017).

References 

Living people
Curators
African art curators
Alumni of Kingston University
21st-century Zimbabwean people
1970 births